Khuzdar is a district in the Balochistan province of Pakistan. Its capital is the city of Khuzdar.

Until its establishment as a district in  1974 it was part of Kalat District. In November 1992 part of the territory of Khuzdar was split off to form the new district of Awaran.

Overview 
Towns and cities in Balochistan are not as big as compared to other provinces generally due to scarcity of water and abundance of arid and wastelands. Khuzdar, though one of the important cities of Balochistan is a small sized city located in Khuzdar District in Balochistan, Pakistan. The city of Khuzdar is situated on National Highway linking Pakistan, Iran and Turkey. It is about 400 km from Karachi and 300 km from Quetta, both of them being major cities in the country.

During the period of Arab rule, this region formed the province of Turan, with Khuzdar as the capital. It was an important cantonment and was the headquarters of the Arab General Commanding the Indian frontier. Later Khuzdar became a part of the Kalat State. It was the scene of a battle between the people of Jhalawan and the Khan of Kalat in 1869. The Khan of Kalat Mir Khuda Khan was victorious and built a fort of painted pottery here. Close to the town are the ruins of an old fort built by the Arabs. Khuzdar is the capital of Khuzdar district. It is a district and divisional headquarters town in Balochistan. Previously part of the Kalat district, Khuzdar was upgraded as a separate district on 1 March 1974. The district is subdivided into four tehsils: Khuzdar, Zehri, Naal and Wadh. It is at the apex of a narrow valley at an elevation of 1,237 m (4.000 feet). Over 99% of the people of the area are Muslims. The population of Khuzdar district is estimated to be over 525,000 in 2005.  The major tribes in the district are Gongav, Bizenjo, Mardoi Jattak, Hasni, Siapad, Nausherwani, moosiani Zehri, Mengal, Zarakzai, Ahmadzai' Rekizai ' Sasoli ' Kurd'. A large military complex is near completion near Khuzdar, which would make it the second largest Cantonment in Balochistan after Quetta.
A university is at the outskirts of Khuzdar, known as the heart of Balochistan. The city of Khuzdar is situated on National Highway linking Pakistan, Iran and Turkey.
The city has an airport near the university.

Administration 
The district is administratively subdivided into five tehsils, which include 34 union councils:

 Khuzdar

 Nall
 Wadh
 Moola
 Zehri

The Union Council for each tehsil is given below:

 Khuzdar – Baghbana, Balina Khattan, Faizabad, Ferozabad, Gazgi, Khand, Parko, Sasol, Tootak, Zeedi, Zerina Khattan
 Moola – Abad KarKh, Moola, Sun Chakoo, Kharzan
 Nall – Durnaili, Goni Gresha, Hazar Ganji, Killi Alam Khan, Kocho, Nal, Ornach, Sar Raij
 Wadh – Arenji, Badari, Loop, Pesi Kapper, Saroona, Shah Noorani, Wadh, Waheer
 Zehri – Chashma, Ghat, Noorgama Zehri

Source: (Local Government, Balochistan, 2005)

Demographics

At the time of the 2017 census the district had a population of 798,896, of which 419,351 were males and 379,468 females. Rural population was 523,134 (65.48%) while the urban population was 275,762 (34.52%). The literacy rate was 35.90% - the male literacy rate was 43.19% while the female literacy rate was 27.93%. 4,317 people in the district were from religious minorities, mainly Hindus.

Languages

At the time of the 2017 census, 75.59% of the population spoke Brahui, 21.16% Balochi and 1.55% Pashto as their first language.

The majority of the population is made up of Brahui-speaking tribes, and according to the 1981 census Brahui was the first language in 82% of households, followed by Balochi with 13%. In the 1998 census, which did not gather data for Brahui, 96.7% of the population reported their language as Balochi, and % – as Punjabi.

Education 
According to the Pakistan District Education Rankings 2017, district Khuzdar is ranked at number 122 out of the 141 ranked districts in Pakistan on the education score index. This index considers learning, gender parity and retention in the district.

Literacy rate in 2014–15 of population 10 years and older in the district stands at 45% whereas for females it is only 26%.

Post primary access is a major issue in the district with 87% schools being at primary level. Compare this with high schools which constitute only 5% of government schools in the district. This is also reflected in the enrolment figures for 2016–17 with 23,848 students enrolled in class 1 to 5 and only 698 students enrolled in class 9 and 10.

Gender disparity is another issue in the district. Only 30% schools in the district are girls’ schools. Access to education for girls is a major issue in the district and is also reflected in the low literacy rates for females.

Moreover, the schools in the district lack basic facilities. According to Alif Ailaan district education rankings 2017, the district is ranked at number 127 out of the 155 districts of Pakistan for primary school infrastructure. At the middle school level, it is ranked at number 133 out of the 155 districts. These rankings take into account the basic facilities available in schools including drinking water, working toilet, availability of electricity, existence of a boundary wall and general building condition. More than 4 out of 5 schools do not have electricity in them. 1 out 3 schools lack a toilet and 1 out of 2 do not have a boundary wall. 1 out of 3 schools do not have clean drinking water.In Khuzdar District 48 Private Schools,Sunrise School 1st private school Established in 1992.

References

Bibliography

External links

 Khuzdar District at www.balochm istan.gov.pk
 Khuzdar District at www.balochistanpolice.gov.pk

 
Districts of Pakistan
Districts of Balochistan, Pakistan